The Alden, Babcock and Calvert Apartments, also known as the Warner Apartments, are three adjoining historic apartment buildings located at 2620-A, 2520-B and 2620-C, respectively, on 13th St., NW, in the Columbia Heights neighborhood of Washington, D.C. They were designed and built in 1904 by Edgar S. Kennedy and Isaac N Davis of Kennedy and Davis in the redbrick Colonial Revival-style of architecture.

On May 25, 1990, they were added to the National Register of Historic Places.

References

Columbia Heights, Washington, D.C.
Residential buildings on the National Register of Historic Places in Washington, D.C.
Colonial Revival architecture in Washington, D.C.
Residential buildings completed in 1904
Apartment buildings in Washington, D.C.